Nickel monosilicide is an intermetallic compound formed out of nickel and silicon. Like other nickel silicides, NiSi is of importance in the area of microelectronics.

Preparation 
Nickel monosilicide can be prepared by depositing a nickel layer on silicon and subsequent annealing. In the case of Ni films with thicknesses above 4 nm, the normal phase transition is given by Ni2Si at 250 °C followed by NiSi at 350 °C and NiSi2 at approximately 800 °C. For films with an initial Ni thickness below 4 nm a direct transition from orthorhombic Ni2Si to epitaxial NiSi2−x, skipping the nickel monosilicide phase, is observed.

Uses 
Several properties make NiSi an important local contact material in the area of microelectronics, among them a reduced thermal budget, low resistivity of 13–14 μΩ·cm and a reduced Si consumption when compared to alternative compounds.

References 

Intermetallics
Silicon compounds
Nickel compounds